Adhesive capsulitis, also known as frozen shoulder, is a condition associated with shoulder pain and stiffness. It is a common shoulder ailment that is marked by pain and a loss of range of motion, particularly in external rotation. There is a loss of the ability to move the shoulder, both voluntarily and by others, in multiple directions. The shoulder itself, however, does not generally hurt significantly when touched. Muscle loss around the shoulder may also occur. Onset is gradual over weeks to months. Complications can include fracture of the humerus or biceps tendon rupture.

The cause in most cases is unknown. The condition can also occur after injury or surgery to the shoulder. Risk factors include diabetes and thyroid disease. The underlying mechanism involves inflammation and scarring. The diagnosis is generally based on a person's symptoms and a physical exam. The diagnosis may be supported by an MRI. Adhesive capsulitis has been linked to diabetes and hypothyroidism, according to research. Adhesive capsulitis was five times more common in diabetic patients than in the control group, according to a meta-analysis published in 2016.

The condition often resolves itself over time without intervention but this may take several years. While a number of treatments, such as NSAIDs, physical therapy, steroids, and injecting the shoulder at high pressure, may be tried, it is unclear what is best. Surgery may be suggested for those who do not get better after a few months. About 4% of people are affected. It is more common in people 40–60 years of age and in women.

Signs and symptoms 
Symptoms include shoulder pain and limited range of motion although these symptoms are common in many shoulder conditions. An important symptom of adhesive capsulitis is the severity of stiffness that often makes it nearly impossible to carry out simple arm movements. Pain due to frozen shoulder is usually dull or aching and may be worse at night and with any motion.

The symptoms of primary frozen shoulder have been described as having three or four stages. Sometimes a prodromal stage is described that can be present up to three months prior to the shoulder freezing. During this stage people describe sharp pain at end ranges of motion, achy pain at rest, and sleep disturbances.
 Stage one: The "freezing" or painful stage, which may last from six weeks to nine months, and in which the patient has a slow onset of pain. As the pain worsens, the shoulder loses motion.
 Stage two: The "frozen" or adhesive stage is marked by a slow improvement in pain but the stiffness remains. This stage generally lasts from four to twelve months.
 Stage three: The "thawing" or recovery, when shoulder motion slowly returns toward normal. This generally lasts from 5 to 26 months.

Physical exam findings include restricted range of motion in all planes of movement in both active and passive range of motion. This contrasts with conditions such as shoulder impingement syndrome or rotator cuff tendinitis in which the active range of motion is restricted but passive range of motion is normal. Some exam maneuvers of the shoulder may be impossible due to pain.

Causes 

The causes of adhesive capsulitis are incompletely understood; however, there are several factors associated with higher risk. Risk factors for secondary adhesive capsulitis include injury or surgery leading to prolonged immobility. Risk factors for primary, or idiopathic adhesive capsulitis include many systemic diseases, such as COVID-19, diabetes mellitus, stroke, lung disease, connective tissue diseases, thyroid disease, heart disease, autoimmune disease, and Dupuytren's contracture. Both type 1 diabetes and type 2 diabetes are risk factors for the condition.

Primary 

Primary adhesive capsulitis, also known as idiopathic adhesive capsulitis, occurs with no known trigger. It is more likely to develop in the non-dominant arm.

Secondary 

Adhesive capsulitis is called secondary when it develops after an injury or surgery to the shoulder.

Pathophysiology 

The underlying pathophysiology is incompletely understood, but is generally accepted to have both inflammatory and fibrotic components. The hardening of the shoulder joint capsule is central to the disease process. This is the result of scar tissue (adhesions) around the joint capsule. There also may be a reduction in synovial fluid, which normally helps the shoulder joint, a ball and socket joint, move by lubricating the gap between the humerus and the socket in the shoulder blade. In the painful stage (stage I), there is evidence of inflammatory cytokines in the joint fluid. Later stages are characterized by dense collagenous tissue in the joint capsule.

Under the microscope, the appearance of the affected shoulder joint capsule tissue is similar to the appearance of the tissue that restricts finger movement in Dupuytren's contracture.

Diagnosis 
Adhesive capsulitis can be diagnosed by history and physical exam. It is often a diagnosis of exclusion, as other causes of shoulder pain and stiffness must first be ruled out. On physical exam, adhesive capsulitis can be diagnosed if limits of the active range of motion are the same or similar to the limits to the passive range of motion. The movement that is most severely inhibited is external rotation of the shoulder.

Imaging studies are not required for diagnosis, but may be used to rule out other causes of pain. Radiographs will often be normal, but imaging features of adhesive capsulitis can be seen on ultrasound or non-contrast MRI. Ultrasound and MRI can help in diagnosis by assessing the coracohumeral ligament, with a width of greater than 3 mm being  60% sensitive and 95% specific for the diagnosis. Shoulders with adhesive capsulitis also characteristically fibrose and thicken at the axillary pouch and "rotator interval", best seen as a dark signal on T1 sequences with edema and inflammation on T2 sequences. A finding on ultrasound associated with adhesive capsulitis is hypoechoic material surrounding the long head of the biceps tendon at the rotator interval, reflecting fibrosis. In the painful stage, such hypoechoic material may demonstrate increased vascularity with Doppler ultrasound.

Grey-scale ultrasound can play a key role in timely diagnosis of adhesive capsulitis due to its high sensitivity and specificity. It is also widely available, convenient, and cost efficient. Thickening in the coracohumeral ligament, inferior capsule/ axillary recess capsule, and rotator interval abnormality, as well as restriction in range of motion in the shoulder can be detected using ultrasound. The range of motion is prohibited due to scapulohumeral rhythm changes occurring in the shoulder joint. The altered scapular kinematics can restrict anterior and posterior tilting, downward rotation and depression as well as external rotation. All of these restrictions lead the scapula to be excessively upwardly rotated. The restriction of the scapular posterior tilt is due to tightness in the lower serratus anterior, anterior capsule and the pectoralis minor. Downward rotation and depression are restricted due to the tightness of the rhomboids, upper trapezius and the superior capsule. Respective sensitivity values were 64.4, 82.1, 82.6, and 94.3, and respective specificity levels were 88.9, 95.7, 93.9, and 90.9.

Management 
Management of this disorder focuses on restoring joint movement and reducing shoulder pain, involving medications, acupuncture therapy, or surgery. Treatment may continue for months; there is no strong evidence to favor any particular approach. The main treatment for adhesive capsulitis is a trial of conservative therapies, including analgesia, exercise, oral nonsteroidal anti-inflammation drugs, and intra-articular corticosteroid injections.

Medications such as NSAIDs can be used for pain control. Corticosteroids are used in some cases either through local injection or systemically. In the short term, intra-articular corticosteroid injections were more effective in pain alleviation. Unfortunately, this pain reduction was not long-lasting. In both the short and long term, intra-articular corticosteroid injections improved passive range of motion (ROM). Oral steroids may provide short-term benefits in range of movement and pain but have side effects such as hyperglycemia. Steroid injections compared to physical therapy have a similar effect in improving shoulder function and decreasing pain. The benefits of steroid injections appear to be short-term. The results of this study imply that using an IA corticosteroid early in individuals with frozen shoulder who have had it for less than a year had a better prognosis. To increase the chances of recovery, this treatment should be combined with a home exercise program. Oral corticosteroids should not be used consistently to treat adhesive capsulitis because of the dangers associated with long-term use and the lack of long-term benefit.

If these measures are unsuccessful, more aggressive interventions such as surgery can be trialed. Manipulation of the shoulder under general anesthesia to break up the adhesions is sometimes used. Hydrodilatation or distension arthrography is controversial. However, some studies show that arthrographic distension may play a positive role in reducing pain and improve range of movement and function. Surgery to cut the adhesions (capsular release) may be indicated in prolonged and severe cases; the procedure is usually performed by arthroscopy. Surgical evaluation of other problems with the shoulder, e.g., subacromial bursitis or rotator cuff tear, may be needed. Resistant adhesive capsulitis may respond to open release surgery. This technique allows the surgeon to find and correct the underlying cause of restricted glenohumeral movement such as contracture of coracohumeral ligament and rotator interval.

Prognosis 

Most cases of adhesive capsulitis are self limiting, but may take 1 to 3 years to fully resolve. Pain and stiffness may not completely resolve in 20 to 50 per cent of affected people.

Epidemiology 
Adhesive capsulitis newly affects approximately 0.75% to 5.0% percent of people a year. Rates are higher in people with diabetes (10–46%). Following breast surgery, some known complications include loss of shoulder range of motion (ROM) and reduced functional mobility in the involved arm. Occurrence is rare in children and people under 40. with the highest prevalence between 40 and 70 years of age. The condition is more common in women than in men (70% of patients are women aged 40–60). People with diabetes, stroke, lung disease, rheumatoid arthritis, or heart disease are at a higher risk for frozen shoulder. Symptoms in people with diabetes may be more protracted than in the non-diabetic population.

See also 
 Calcific tendinitis
 Milwaukee shoulder syndrome
 Shoulder injury related to vaccine administration

References

External links 

Disorders of fascia
Soft tissue disorders
Orthopedic surgical procedures
Shoulder
Wikipedia medicine articles ready to translate